Chrysoglossa phaethon is a moth of the family Notodontidae first described by William Schaus in 1912. It is found in Costa Rica.

References

Moths described in 1912
Notodontidae